The following is a list of international organization leaders in 2017.

UN organizations

Political and economic organizations

Financial organizations

Sports organizations

Other organizations

See also
List of state leaders in 2017
List of religious leaders in 2017
List of international organization leaders in 2016
List of international organization leaders in 2018

References 

2017
2017 in international relations
Lists of office-holders in 2017